Prairie du Chien is a city in and the county seat of Crawford County, Wisconsin, United States.  The population was 5,506 at the 2020 census. Its ZIP Code is 53821.

Often called Wisconsin's second-oldest city, Prairie du Chien was established as a European settlement by French voyageurs in the late 17th century. Its settlement date of June 17, 1673, makes it the fourth colonial settlement by European settlers in the Midwestern United States, after Green Bay, Wisconsin, Sault Ste. Marie, Michigan, and St. Ignace, Michigan. The city has many sites showing its rich history in the region. 

Prairie du Chien is near the confluence of the Wisconsin and Mississippi rivers, a strategic point along the Fox-Wisconsin Waterway that connects the Great Lakes with the Mississippi. This location offered early French missionaries and explorers their first access and entrance to the Mississippi River. 

Early French visitors to the site found it occupied by a group of Fox Indians led by a chief whose name Alim meant chien in French ("dog" in English). The French explorers named the location Prairie du Chien, French for "Dog's Meadow". Originally this name applied only to the plain upon which the settlement lay, but it was later applied to the city as well. The city of Prairie du Chien is between the Town of Prairie du Chien and the Town of Bridgeport.

History

The first known Europeans to reach Prairie du Chien were French explorers Jacques Marquette and Louis Joliet, who arrived by canoe on June 17, 1673, discovering a route to the Mississippi River. Later travel between Canada and the Mississippi River continued to pass through Prairie du Chien, although routes via the Illinois River were also used. In 1685, the French explorer Nicolas Perrot established a trading post in the area as part of the large and lucrative French fur trade industry. After John Jacob Astor's machinations had closed the entire government fur trade factory system and the federal factory established in Prairie du Chien in 1815, the American Fur Company became established in the area and later built the Astor Fur Warehouse, an important building in the regional fur trade, which was centered in Prairie du Chien. Prairie du Chien's significance as a center of the fur trade did not diminish until the mid-19th century, when European demand declined, as did game stock.

In 1763, after Great Britain defeated France in the French and Indian War (part of the Seven Years' War), it took possession of the French territory in North America east of the Mississippi River, including Prairie du Chien. During the American Revolutionary War, the city was used as a meeting point for British troops and their Native American allies. After the American victory, the Treaty of Paris (1783) granted the area to the new United States of America, but the British and their Loyalists were slow to withdraw. Only after the War of 1812 did the city become fully American.

The U.S. was slow to present any authority over Prairie du Chien, but late in the War of 1812, when the government realized the importance of holding the site to prevent British attacks from Canada, it began construction of Fort Shelby in 1814. In July, British soldiers captured the fort during the Siege of Prairie du Chien. The British maintained control over the city until the war's end in 1815. Not wanting another invasion through Prairie du Chien, the Americans constructed Fort Crawford in 1816.

The fort was the site of the negotiations and signing of the Treaties of Prairie du Chien (1825 and 1830), by which the Fox and Sauk ceded much of their land to the U.S. Representing them and the United Nations of the Chippewa, Ottawa and Pottawatomie in the 1829 negotiations was Billy Caldwell, of Scots-Irish and Mohawk descent. He became involved with the Pottawatomie after moving as a young man to the U.S. from Canada.

In 1829, the army doctor William Beaumont carried out many experiments on digestion in the hospital at Fort Crawford. Beaumont's discoveries are still the basis of current knowledge of the human digestive process.

Colonel Zachary Taylor, who later became the 12th U.S. president, was the commanding officer at Fort Crawford during the Black Hawk War of 1832. Taylor oversaw the surrender of Black Hawk in Prairie du Chien. Lieutenant Jefferson Davis, who later became president of the Confederate States of America, was stationed at Fort Crawford at the same time. There, Davis met Taylor's daughter, Sarah "Knoxie" Taylor, whom he married in 1835.

Outside the fort's walls, early-19th-century life in Prairie du Chien was still dominated by the fur trade. Prairie du Chien's best-known traders during this time were Michel Brisbois, Joseph Rolette, Nathan Myrick, and Hercules L. Dousman. Dousman built a fortune in the fur trade, which, combined with income from investments in land, steamboats, and railroads, propelled him to become Wisconsin's first millionaire. He died in 1868, and his son, H. Louis Dousman, inherited much of his fortune. In 1870, Louis Dousman used his inheritance to construct a luxurious Victorian mansion at the site of the former Fort Shelby. When he died unexpectedly in 1886, his family renamed the home "Villa Louis" in his memory. The Dousman family continued to occupy the home until 1913. In 1952, the mansion became Wisconsin's first state-operated historic site.

After the fur trade declined in the mid-19th century, Prairie du Chien's attention shifted to agriculture and the railroad. Although the city was first connected to the Milwaukee & Mississippi Railroad in 1857, the width of the Mississippi River posed a challenge for further expansion of the railroad into Iowa. This problem was temporarily solved by disassembling the trains at Prairie du Chien and ferrying them across the river to be put back on the tracks on the other side. A better solution was found by Michael Spettel and John Lawler, who designed the permanent Pile-Pontoon Railroad Bridge to span the river in 1874. Lawler took most of the credit for this invention, and made a small fortune through its operation. The bridge remained in use until its removal in 1961.

Lawler later donated property to establish two Catholic boarding schools in Prairie du Chien, St. Mary's Institute (now Mount Mary College of Milwaukee) and Campion High School in the later part of the century. St. Mary's College remained in Prairie du Chien until 1928. Campion High School produced several notable alumni, including Vicente Fox, Congressman Leo Ryan, Governor Patrick Lucey, actors David Doyle, George Wendt, and Kevin McCarthy, and writer Garry Wills. It closed in 1975.

History of municipal government
Prairie du Chien was incorporated as the Borough of Prairie des Chiens on September 17, 1821, by the secretary of the Michigan Territory. It is the only municipality in Wisconsin other than Green Bay to have been known as a borough, rather than a city, town, or village. The borough existed for a few years before the government stopped operating in 1825.

In 1828, the Prairie du Chien area became a part of the Town of St. Anthony, which included all of Crawford County. (Crawford County itself included all of the western part of Michigan Territory.) In 1849, the Town of Prairie du Chien was created, consisting of most of present-day Crawford County. The city of Prairie du Chien was incorporated in 1872.

Geography

Prairie du Chien is in the Mississippi River Valley, upon a long triangular plain bounded on the west by the Mississippi River, on the south by the Wisconsin River, and on the east-northeast by a series of tall bluffs. The city's area encompasses most of the plain upon which it sits, but portions of the plain extend outside city limits. Just north of the city limits, where the plain forms part of the Town of Prairie du Chien, is a small unincorporated settlement known locally as "Frenchtown". The plain also extends outside the city southward into the Town of Bridgeport. Here the plain ends, becoming the wetlands of the Wisconsin River Delta.

Both inside and outside the city limits, backwaters of the Mississippi River occasionally break across the far west side of the plain to form small islands. Most of these islands are too small and flood-prone to have ever been inhabited, but one just west of downtown Prairie du Chien formed the city's fourth ward until a 1965 flood prompted its residents' mandatory relocation to higher ground. During the relocation project, most buildings with no special historical significance were removed. Now called St. Feriole Island, the island serves as a  city park.

Climate 

Prairie du Chien has recorded Wisconsin's highest temperatures for January, March, May, September, and November.

Geology

The city gives its name to the Prairie du Chien Dolomite, a layer of dolomite widely found in western Wisconsin.

Demographics

2020 census
As of the census of 2020, the population was 5,506. Ethnically, the population was 2.5% Hispanic or Latino of any race. When grouping both Hispanic and non-Hispanic people together by race, the city was 90.1% White, 4.3% Black or African American, 0.7% Native American, 0.5% Asian, 0.6% from other races, and 3.8% from two or more races. 

The 2020 census population of the city included 514 people incarcerated in adult correctional facilities.

According to American Community Survey estimates for 2016-2020, the median income for a household in the city was $46,541, and the median income for a family was $64,315. Male full-time workers had a median income of $42,478 versus $35,313 for female workers. The per capita income was $25,407. About 10.5% of families and 16.2% of the population were below the poverty line, including 30.7% of those under age 18 and 14.6% of those age 65 or over. 

There were 2,306 households, of which 18% had children under the age of 18 living with them, 40.1% were married couples living together, 8.5% had a female householder with no husband present, 4% had a male householder with no wife present, and 47.3% were non-families. 38.5% of all households were made up of individuals, and 17.3% had someone living alone who was 65 years of age or older. The average household size was 2.12 and the average family size was 2.87. Of the population age 25 and over, 92.0% were high school graduates or higher and 15.8% had a bachelor's degree or higher.

The median age in the city was 45.6 years. 16.6% of residents were under the age of 18; 8.8% were between the ages of 18 and 24; 24.07% were from 25 to 44; 28.2% were from 45 to 64; and 22.3% were 65 years of age or older. The gender makeup of the city was 54.4% male and 45.6% female.

2010 census
As of the census of 2010, there were 5,911 people, 2,386 households, and 1,367 families residing in the city. The racial makeup of the city was 93.6% White, 4.5% African American, 0.4% Native American, 0.3% Asian, 0.3% from other races, and 0.9% from two or more races. Hispanic or Latino of any race were 1.2% of the population.

There were 2,386 households, of which 26.6% had children under the age of 18 living with them, 41.9% were married couples living together, 10.9% had a female householder with no husband present, 4.4% had a male householder with no wife present, and 42.7% were non-families. 37.6% of all households were made up of individuals, and 17.8% had someone living alone who was 65 years of age or older. The average household size was 2.18 and the average family size was 2.86.

The median age in the city was 41.4 years. 21.6% of residents were under the age of 18; 8% were between the ages of 18 and 24; 24.9% were from 25 to 44; 27.3% were from 45 to 64; and 18.3% were 65 years of age or older. The gender makeup of the city was 52.4% male and 47.6% female.

2000 census
As of the census of 2000, there were 6,018 people, 2,376 households, and 1,473 families residing in the city.  The population density was 1,075.9 people per square mile (415.7/km2).  There were 2,564 housing units at an average density of 458.4 per square mile (177.1/km2).  The racial makeup of the city was 95.06% White, 3.61% Black or African American, 0.28% Native American, 0.17% Asian, 0.02% Pacific Islander, 0.08% from other races, and 0.78% from two or more races.  0.88% of the population were Hispanic or Latino of any race.

There were 2,376 households, out of which 29.3% had children under the age of 18 living with them, 48.7% were married couples living together, 10.2% had a female householder with no husband present, and 38.0% were non-families. 33.0% of all households were made up of individuals, and 17.1% had someone living alone who was 65 years of age or older.  The average household size was 2.28 and the average family size was 2.92.

In the city, the population was spread out, with 24.2% under the age of 18, 11.4% from 18 to 24, 24.3% from 25 to 44, 21.8% from 45 to 64, and 18.3% who were 65 years of age or older.  The median age was 38 years. For every 100 females, there were 100.5 males.  For every 100 females age 18 and over, there were 97.3 males.

The median income for a household in the city was $34,038, and the median income for a family was $43,444. Males had a median income of $29,595 versus $20,183 for females. The per capita income for the city was $17,680.  About 6.4% of families and 8.1% of the population were below the poverty line, including 11.7% of those under age 18 and 4.8% of those age 65 or over.

Culture

Prairie du Chien has five National Historic Landmarks and nine sites on the National Register of Historic Places. The five landmarks were the first designated in the state.

It is close to Wyalusing State Park in Wisconsin, and Effigy Mounds National Monument and Pikes Peak State Park in Iowa, sites of natural and manmade wonders.  Its rich history and location by the Mississippi River make it a popular tourist destination. The Prairie Villa Rendezvous, a gathering to recreate the atmosphere of a 19th-century fur trading camp, has been held annually in the city every Father's Day weekend since 1975, attracting tens of thousands of visitors.

In 2001, Prairie du Chien gained brief national attention for its first annual New Year's Eve celebration, during which a carp from the Mississippi River was dropped from a crane over BlackHawk Avenue at midnight. The "Droppin' of the Carp" celebration has been held every New Year's Eve since.

Hunting and fishing have long been popular in the area. The opening of Cabela's fourth outlet store in the city in 1998 firmly established the city as a destination for sportsmen.

Transportation
Bus service to La Crosse is provided three times daily by Scenic Mississippi Regional Transit.

Prairie du Chien is served by the Prairie du Chien Municipal Airport (KPDC).

Media
Prairie du Chien's twice weekly newspaper is the Courier Press, which also publishes a weekly shopping supplement distributed to area households and businesses. Other print media in the area include the Wisconsin-Iowa Shopping News, which is distributed to 19,297 homes and businesses weekly.

Crawford County is in the La Crosse/Eau Claire broadcast media market as monitored by ACNielsen. The local cable system also carries some channels from the Madison market, and some residents receive over-the-air broadcasts from stations in the Cedar Rapids/Waterloo/Dubuque market.

Prairie du Chien is home to WQPC, a 36,000-watt radio station broadcasting at 94.3FM. The station is near the banks of the Mississippi River on St. Feriole Island. It has a sister station, WPRE 980 AM. Other stations with strong reception in Prairie du Chien include WHHI 91.3FM, WGLR 97.7FM and KCTN 100.1FM.

Economy
Aside from its somewhat larger than average tourist trade, Prairie du Chien's economy is similar to most other Midwestern cities of its size. Retail, service, and manufacturing jobs employ most of the city's residents. Major employers include 3M and Cabela's. State and local government are also major employers, as the city is the site of the Crawford County courthouse and offices, as well as a state penitentiary. Prairie du Chien has one of Wisconsin's busiest ports on the Mississippi River. Two railroads and a two-runway municipal airport make the city a transport and shipping hub for the area.

Education
The Prairie du Chien School District is a public school district headquartered in Prairie du Chien. It serves Prairie du Chien, the nearby town of Bridgeport, and the village of Eastman. The district comprises three schools, all in Prairie du Chien: 
 B. A. Kennedy Elementary School (early childhood education - grade 1).
 Bluff View Intermediate School (grades 2-8)
 Prairie du Chien High School (grades 9-12)
The district's administrative offices are at B. A. Kennedy Elementary School.

Prairie Catholic School, a private K-8 school associated with St. Gabriel's and St. John's Catholic Churches, and Prairie Christian Academy, a private K-12 school associated with Bible Baptist Church, are also in Prairie du Chien.

Recreation

The annual 7-day, 500-mile supported bike tour of Wisconsin known as GRABAAWR begins in Eagle River and ends in Prairie du Chien.

St. Feriole Island has a long riverfront with a park, connected to a bike path that goes around the island. Shelters can be used for large events. Across from the Villa Louis is a large open field that was once used as a horse racing track. On the far end of the field are two large soccer fields. Pets are allowed to run in the large fields.

Notable people

 Matthew Antoine (b. 1985), bronze medalist in men's skeleton at the 2014 Winter Olympics in Sochi, Russia
 William Beaumont, Army doctor in 1820s, carried out experiments on human digestion system at Fort Crawford hospital
 Barbara Bedford (1908–1981), silent film and Western actress
 Nicholas Boilvin (1761–1827), 19th Century frontiersman
 Pat Bowlen (1944–2019), owner of the Denver Broncos
 Michel Brisbois (1759–1837), voyageur
 Benjamin Bull, lawyer and Wisconsin State Senator
 Walter Bradford Cannon (1871–1945), physiologist who first developed concepts of fight or flight and homeostasis
 William D. Carroll, Wisconsin State Senator
 Jefferson Davis, President of Confederate States of America, was stationed at Fort Crawford in the 1830s
 Hercules Louis Dousman (1800–1868), real estate speculator and Wisconsin's first millionaire
 Alexander Faribault, trading post operator and Minnesota territorial legislator
 Johann Georg Hagen (1847–1930), Jesuit priest and astronomer.
 Buel Hutchinson, lawyer and politician
 Daniel Harris Johnson, state Representative
 Edward I. Kidd, Wisconsin state legislator and businessman
 Wiram Knowlton (1816–1863), Wisconsin Supreme Court judge
 Daniel W. Lawler, mayor of Saint Paul, Minnesota
 Henry Leavenworth (1783–1834), U.S. army officer in War of 1812 and against Plains Indians
 James Henry Lockwood (1793-1857), lawyer, merchant, fur trapper
 Patrick Joseph Lucey (1918-2014), U.S. diplomat; 38th Governor of Wisconsin (1971–1977)
 Frederic O. MacCartney (1864-1903), Unitarian minister and Massachusetts socialist state legislator
 Thomas Mower McDougall (1845–1909), U.S. Army officer
 John Muir (1838–1914), conservationist and founder of Sierra Club, employed at boarding house in Prairie du Chien before attending University of Wisconsin–Madison
 Maurice Oehler (Chemist), founder of the National Mole Day Foundation
 John Powers, NFL player
 Leo Ryan (1925–1978), U.S. Representative from California
 Rodney J. Satter, state Representative
 Paul Scherrman, Iowa state legislature
 Daniel Bartlett Stevens, state Representative
 Joseph M. Street (1782–1840), U.S. Army officer and U.S. Indian agent to the Winnebago, Sauk, and Fox tribes after the Black Hawk War
 Jeremiah Burnham Tainter (1836–1920), engineer who invented Tainter gate
 Ormsby B. Thomas, U.S. Representative
 William Miller Wallace (1844–1924), U.S. Army general
 Wapello (1787–1842), Native American chief of Fox tribe
 George Wendt (b. 1948), actor who portrayed Norm Peterson in television series Cheers, attended Campion High School in Prairie du Chien
 Brad Williams, memory specialist

References

Further reading
 Lucy Eldersveld Murphy, Great Lakes Creoles: A French-Indian Community on the Northern Borderlands, Prairie du Chien, 1750-1860. New York: Cambridge University Press, 2014.

External links

 City of Prairie du Chien
 Prairie du Chien Chamber of Commerce
 Sanborn fire insurance maps: 1884 1892 1899 1905 1912

 
Cities in Wisconsin
Cities in Crawford County, Wisconsin
Wisconsin populated places on the Mississippi River
County seats in Wisconsin
Populated places established in 1673
1673 establishments in New France